Redemption is the ninth studio album by the Hungarian Heavy metal band Ektomorf, released 17 December 2010.

Track listing 
"Last Fight" - 4:16
"Redemption" - 2:51
"I'm in Hate" - 3:25
"God Will Cut You Down" - 3:04
"Stay Away" - 2:25
"Never Should" - 4:21
"Sea of My Misery" - 2:12
"The One" (feat. Danko Jones) - 3:40
"Revolution" - 3:48
"Cigany" - 3:08
"Stigmatized" - 4:38
"Anger" - 3:28
"Kill Me Now" (limited edition digipak bonus track)

References

2010 albums
Ektomorf albums
AFM Records albums